Roberto Pagnin (born 8 July 1962) is an Italian former professional racing cyclist. He rode in one edition of the Tour de France, ten editions of the Giro d'Italia and five editions of the Vuelta a España. He also rode in the individual road race at the 1984 Summer Olympics.

References

External links
 

1962 births
Living people
Italian male cyclists
Cyclists at the 1984 Summer Olympics
Olympic cyclists of Italy
Cyclists from the Metropolitan City of Venice
Tour de Suisse stage winners